Vicente Sánchez is a retired Cuban hammer thrower.

He won the silver medal at the 1983 Central American and Caribbean Championships, the gold medal at the 1986 Central American and Caribbean Games, finished fourth at the 1986 Ibero-American Championships, won the gold medal at the 1987 Central American and Caribbean Championships, the bronze medal at the 1987 Pan American Games and the silver medal at the 1988 Ibero-American Championships. He also became Cuban champion.

References

Year of birth missing (living people)
Living people
Cuban male hammer throwers
Central American and Caribbean Games gold medalists for Cuba
Pan American Games bronze medalists for Cuba
Athletes (track and field) at the 1987 Pan American Games
Pan American Games medalists in athletics (track and field)
Central American and Caribbean Games medalists in athletics
Competitors at the 1986 Central American and Caribbean Games
Medalists at the 1987 Pan American Games
20th-century Cuban people